is a collection of adult original video animations (OVA) produced by Wonder Kids. It contains many notable firsts, as the first erotic original video animation, depicting hentai scenes which include yuri, BDSM and lolicon characters. It ran from February 1984 to May 1985 and consisted of six episodes. An alternative name for this anime is Wonder Magazine Series and it was based on a manga by Fumio Nakajima, which was serialized in the lolicon magazine Lemon People.

Production
Lolita Anime was planned and produced during the height of the "lolicon boom" in amateur Japanese animation, which was pioneered by figures such as Aki Uchiyama (whose name would be used to promote Lolita Anime by Nikkatsu, released later the same year) and Hideo Azuma. The script and designs of the first two episodes were based on Fumio Nakajima's manga. Sales for these first two episodes were not ideal, which led Wonder Kids to create Miu, a heroine who was more cartoony in appearance and subject to less sadistic treatment than the girls in prior episodes. A third installment by Nakajima was produced, but delayed in favour of Miu's debut episode. The installment was later added to the sixth and final episode.

Not long after Lolita Anime's initial episodes were released, more erotic OVAs went into production from other independent animators. Wonder Kids issued a statement regarding their decision to end the Lolita Anime series: "The flame has now been lit for adult anime."

Staff
Much of Wonder Kids' staff was either uncredited or used pseudonyms. Known names include:
  - Director and producer (episodes 1-2), executive producer
  - Animation director and animator (episodes 1-2) credited as "R. Ching"
  - Director and storyboard artist (episodes 1-2)
  - Director and producer (episode 3) credited as "Mickey Masuda"
  - Scriptwriter credited as "Okajouki" (episodes 1-3), musical arrangement
  - Music producer and lyricist (episodes 3-6)
 E&M Planning Center - Sound effects
  - Corporate planner

Cast
 Masaru Ikeda - Crime boss (episode 1B)
 Yōko Asagami - Miu, Itsuko Hirai (episode 2A), Oneechan (episode 3), Tomoyo (episode 4), Michael (episode 5)
 Shigeru Nakahara - Salaryman (episode 3), Will (episode 5)
 Rokurō Naya - Salaryman (episode 6)

Episodes

Reception and legacy
Lolita Anime received mostly negative reception outside of otaku circles, with The Anime Encyclopedia entry on the work describing it as "disturbing" for its contents, which include gang rape and bondage of fictional underage girls. It also is known as the first erotic anime video release. It also featured the reoccurring character Miu, whose popularity prefigured that of Cream Lemons Ami.

References

External links

1984 anime OVAs
Japanese adult animated films
Hentai anime and manga
Rape in fiction